Asphodelus roseus is a species of asphodel found in Spain and Morocco.

References

Asphodeloideae
Flora of Morocco
Flora of Spain